The 1904 UCI Track Cycling World Championships were the World Championship for track cycling. They took place in London, United Kingdom from 3 to 10 September 1904. Four events for men were contested, two for professionals and two for amateurs.

Medal summary

Medal table

References

Track cycling
UCI Track Cycling World Championships by year
International sports competitions in London
UCI World Championships
UCI Track Cycling World Championships
International cycle races hosted by England
UCI Track Cycling World Championships